Wu Dang is a 2012 Chinese-Hong Kong martial arts fantasy film directed by Patrick Leung, starring Vincent Zhao, Yang Mi, Louis Fan, Dennis To and Xu Jiao. It was first released in mainland China on 6 July 2012.

Plot
The story is set in the early Republican era in China. Tang Yunlong, an archaeology professor, returns from the United States to China and he brings along his daughter, Tang Ning, with him. He meets Paul Chen, an antique seller who deals in stolen artifacts from all over China. A fight breaks out when Tang seizes a treasure map from Chen. Tang defeats Chen's men and escapes with the map. The Tangs then make their way to the Wudang Mountains to attend a martial arts contest. Elsewhere, on an aeroplane, a girl called Tianxin fights with other martial artists on board and steals an invitation card to attend the event at Wudang.

At Wudang, it is revealed that Tang Yunlong and Tianxin are there for the same objective — to hunt for seven treasures hidden all over the Wudang Mountains. Tianxin wants only one of the seven, a sword, which she insists belonged to her family. On the other hand, Tang Yunlong is searching for a magic pill, which can cure his daughter of a rare medical illness that killed his wife. While hunting for the treasures, Tang Yunlong and Tianxin have several encounters and confrontations with the Wudang guardians keeping watch over the treasures, as well as with Paul Chen and his men, who are also there for the treasures.

Cast
 Vincent Zhao as Tang Yunlong
 Yang Mi as Tianxin
 Louis Fan as Shui Heyi
 Dennis To as Taoist Bailong
 Xu Jiao as Tang Ning
 Paw Hee-ching as Shui Heyi's mother
 Henry Fong as Taoist Xie
 Tam Chun-yin as Paul Chen
 Wang Xiao as mute Taoist
 Wang Yuying as Tianxue
 Xiao Xiangfei as Taoist priest
 Liu Jiayu as Taoist nun
 Zhou Yang as housekeeper
 Tian Ruihui as Tong Yan

Production
Wu Dang was directed by Hong Kong film director Patrick Leung, who previously directed other films such as La Brassiere (2001) and The Twins Effect II (2004). The action scenes were choreographed by Hong Kong action director Corey Yuen, who also worked on The Twins Effect II with Leung.

The costumes in the film were designed by Emi Wada, who won the Academy Award for Best Costume Design in 1985.

Wu Dang marked the first time Yang Mi played a "fighter girl" in a martial arts film.

Louis Fan fractured his toe while performing a difficult stunt in one scene, but, despite his injury, he insisted on continuing until the shooting ended.

Release
Vincent Zhao and Yang Mi attended a press event in Beijing on 30 May 2012 to promote the film. Wu Dang was released in mainland China on 6 July 2012 and in Hong Kong on 17 July 2012.

Reception
Yangtze River Daily (长江日报) reporter Wan Xuming (万旭明) wrote, "Based on the immense response at the auditions held in Hengdian World Studios, the audience probably regard this film as one that showcases the grandeur of the Wudang Mountains."

On 16 July 2012, NetEase stated that the plot of Wu Dang not only closely resembles that of Tiandao Mima (天道密码), a novel by Sima Changxiao (司马长啸) published in August 2011, but its Chinese title (Da Wudang Zhi Tiandi Mima) is also very similar to that of the novel. This led to suspicions of plagiarism.

References

External links
 
 
  Wu Dang on moviemtime.com
  Wu Dang on Sina.com

2012 films
2012 action films
Hong Kong action films
Chinese action adventure films
Chinese martial arts films
2010s Mandarin-language films
Films set in China
2012 martial arts films
Martial arts fantasy films
2010s Hong Kong films